Joshua Gregory Lambo (born November 19, 1990) is a former American football placekicker and former professional soccer goalkeeper.

Lambo was drafted in the first round of the 2008 MLS SuperDraft by FC Dallas. Despite being a member of the team for three seasons, he never played in an MLS match. After retiring from soccer at the age of 21, he began playing college football for Texas A&M from 2012 to 2014.

He was signed by the San Diego Chargers as an undrafted free agent in 2015, playing for the Chargers for two seasons. He was then signed by the Jacksonville Jaguars partway in the 2017 season. With the Jaguars, he was a Second-team All-Pro in 2019 and was released partway in the 2021 season. He has since had brief stints with the Pittsburgh Steelers' practice squad and the Tennessee Titans.

Early life
Born in Lansing, Michigan, Lambo moved with his family to Crystal Lake, Illinois, when he was a small child. He played club soccer for the Chicago Magic before moving to Middleton, Wisconsin, in the summer of 2005, where he attended Middleton High School for less than two months before signing a Generation Adidas contract and joining the USA Residency Program in Bradenton, Florida. At the age of 15, he spent the summer training with Everton F.C. during their US tour in 2006 on the recommendation of US international Tim Howard and was invited to Finch Farm before being offered a professional contract on the provision that he could secure an EU passport due to his Greek heritage.

Professional soccer career

Club career
Lambo was drafted in the first round (8th overall) of the 2008 MLS SuperDraft by FC Dallas. He played in the MLS Reserve Division, and was a named first team substitute on several occasions, but missed most of the second half of the 2008 season after he broke his jaw in a reserve team game. Lambo never played in an MLS match, but did appear for his team in an international friendly match versus Costa Rica’s CS Herediano in June 2009.

Lambo was loaned to USSF Division 2 Professional League expansion team FC Tampa Bay for the 2010 season. He made his professional debut on May 14, 2010, in a 2–1 victory over the Carolina RailHawks.

Lambo was waived by Dallas at the end of the 2011 season. He went on trial with D.C. United and Sheffield United in January 2012. After turning down offers from the NASL and the chance of becoming a MLS pool goalkeeper, he retired from professional soccer at the age of 21.

International career
Lambo made two appearances for the United States U-17 national team during the 2007 FIFA U-17 World Cup after starting the competition as a substitute. He made his debut in the third and last group stage match against Belgium, playing the whole game and keeping a clean sheet against a side that fielded future Premier League players Eden Hazard and Christian Benteke and was the goalkeeper in the 2–1 loss against Germany in the round of 16. He was an unused substitute for the United States U-20 national team at the 2009 FIFA U-20 World Cup.

College career
In the fall of 2012, Lambo enrolled at Texas A&M University and joined the football team as a placekicker. He became starting field goal kicker after overtaking Taylor Bertolet during the 2013 season (Bertolet remained the kick-off specialist). His first career appearance came on September 22, 2012, when he made an extra point against South Carolina State. His first game-winning field goal came against Ole Miss on October 12, 2013. With the game tied at 38 and only four seconds remaining in the game, Lambo kicked a 33-yard field goal to win the game for the Aggies. Lambo converted all 59 extra point attempts for the 2014 season.
He went on to compete in the 2015 NFLPA Collegiate Bowl.

Professional American football career

San Diego / Los Angeles Chargers
On May 2, 2015, after going undrafted in the 2015 NFL Draft, Lambo signed a contract as a free agent with the San Diego Chargers. Lambo was brought in for competition for the kicker spot. On September 5, Lambo won the starting job over the incumbent veteran Nick Novak. He displayed a strong leg during exhibition games, while Novak did not have a touchback in the final half of the 2014 season.

In the 2015 season, Lambo converted 26 of 32 field goal attempts.

On December 24, 2016, in a game against the 0–14 Cleveland Browns, Lambo missed a game tying field goal in the final seconds of the game, allowing the Browns to claim the win.

On September 2, 2017, Lambo was released by the Chargers after losing the starting kicker job to rookie Younghoe Koo.

Jacksonville Jaguars
On October 17, 2017, Lambo signed with the Jacksonville Jaguars.
On November 12, 2017, Lambo made a game-winning 30-yard field goal in overtime to give the Jaguars a 20–17 win over the Los Angeles Chargers.

In Week 8 of the 2018 season, Lambo kicked a new career-long 57-yard field goal against the Philadelphia Eagles. He was placed on injured reserve on December 28, 2018, with a groin injury.

On February 13, 2019, Lambo signed a four-year, $15.5-million contract extension with the Jaguars. In Week 4, Lambo converted two extra points and went 4-for-4 on field goals, including the game-winning 33-yarder as time expired in a 26–24 win over the Denver Broncos, earning him AFC Special Teams Player of the Week. In Week 7, Lambo hit all four of his field goals and an extra point in a 27–17 win over the Cincinnati Bengals, earning him his second AFC Special Teams Player of the Week award of the season.

On September 23, 2020, Lambo was placed on injured reserve with a hip injury. He was activated on October 22. In Week 9, Lambo kicked a career-long and franchise-tying 59-yard field goal. However in the same game, he re-injured his hip on an onside kick attempt and was placed on season-ending injured reserve on November 9, 2020.

On October 19, 2021, Lambo was released by the Jaguars.

On December 15, Lambo accused first-year Jaguars head coach Urban Meyer of kicking him in the leg during warmups before the team's final preseason game. This accusation would ultimately play a pivotal role in Meyer's firing early the next day. He later filed a lawsuit against the team alleging that Meyer created a hostile work environment and the Jaguars did nothing to stop it.

Pittsburgh Steelers
On November 2, 2021, Lambo was signed to the Pittsburgh Steelers practice squad. He was released on November 11.

Tennessee Titans
On November 16, 2022, Lambo signed with the Tennessee Titans as an injury replacement for Randy Bullock. Lambo made three of his four extra point attempts in a 27-17 win over the Green Bay Packers. He was waived five days later.

Personal life
Lambo married his wife Megan in June 2018.

References

External links
 Jacksonville Jaguars bio
 Los Angeles Chargers bio
 Texas A&M Aggies bio
 
 

1990 births
Living people
American football placekickers
American soccer players
Association football goalkeepers
American people of Greek descent
FC Dallas draft picks
FC Dallas players
USSF Division 2 Professional League players
Tampa Bay Rowdies players
Texas A&M Aggies football players
United States men's under-20 international soccer players
United States men's youth international soccer players
Soccer players from Chicago
People from Middleton, Wisconsin
People from East Lansing, Michigan
Soccer players from Wisconsin
San Diego Chargers players
Footballers who switched code
Players of American football from Wisconsin
Los Angeles Chargers players
Jacksonville Jaguars players
Tennessee Titans players
2009 CONCACAF U-20 Championship players
Association football players that played in the NFL
Pittsburgh Steelers players